Zhuravleva is a romanisation of a Cyrillic surname. Notable people who have had their name transliterated to be this include:

 Anastasiya Juravleva (born 1981), Uzbekistani jumper athlete
 Lyudmila Zhuravleva (born 1946), Crimean astronomer
 Tatiana Zhuravleva (born 1989), Russian discus thrower
 Valentina Zhuravlyova (1933–2004), Soviet writer

See also 

 Minor planet 26087 Zhuravleva, named after the aforementioned Lyudmila Zhuravleva